The Military ranks of Honduras are the military insignia used by the Armed Forces of Honduras.

Commissioned officer ranks
The rank insignia of commissioned officers.

Other ranks
The rank insignia of non-commissioned officers and enlisted personnel.

References

External links
 
 

Honduras
Military of Honduras